Anıl is a village in the Hani District of Diyarbakır Province in Turkey.

References

Villages in Hani District